Ellen Sofie Kathrine Gottschalch (2 May 1894 – 17 February 1981), was a Danish stage and film actress.

She worked in the Arhus Theatre in 1911 then the Det Ny Theater in Copenhagen from 1912 to 1928. She entered film in 1938. She was employed at the Royal Danish Theatre from 1941 to 1961 where she among roles played in Death of a Salesman and Mor Karen in Elverhøj by Johan Ludvig Heiberg.

She was married to Christian Viggo Gottschalch 1915–1930 and later lived with the composer Kai Normann Andersen from 1932 to 1967. She died in 1981 and was buried at the Frederiksberg Ældre Kirkegård.

Filmography 

 Champagnegaloppen – 1938
  – 1940
 Jeg har elsket og levet – 1940
  – 1940
 Far skal giftes – 1941
 En pige uden lige – 1943
  – 1943
  – 1946
  – 1947
  – 1948
  – 1949
  – 1950
 Susanne – 1950
  – 1951
  – 1951
 Mød mig på Cassiopeia – 1951
  – 1951
 Vi arme syndere – 1952
  – 1952
 The Crime of Tove Andersen – 1953
  – 1956
 Englen i sort – 1957
 Tre må man være – 1959
  – 1961
 Lykkens musikanter – 1962
 Tine – 1964

Awards 
 Bodil Award for Best Supporting Actress, 1948
 Teaterpokalen, (English: The Teatre Trophy), 1949.
 Ingenio et Arti, 1950
 Tagea Brandts Rejselegat, 1951

References

External links 
 
 
 

1894 births
1981 deaths
Best Supporting Actress Bodil Award winners
Danish film actresses
Danish stage actresses
People from Brønderslev Municipality